Taphiassa is a genus of spiders in the family Anapidae. It was first described in 1880 by Simon. , it contains 6 species.

Species
Taphiassa comprises the following species:
Taphiassa castanea Rix & Harvey, 2010
Taphiassa globosa Rix & Harvey, 2010
Taphiassa impressa Simon, 1880
Taphiassa magna Rix & Harvey, 2010
Taphiassa punctata (Forster, 1959)
Taphiassa punctigera Simon, 1895
Taphiassa robertsi Rix & Harvey, 2010

References

Anapidae
Araneomorphae genera
Spiders of Asia
Spiders of Oceania